The men's +105 kilograms event at the 2006 Asian Games took place on December 6, 2006 at Al-Dana Banquet Hall in Doha.

Schedule
All times are Arabia Standard Time (UTC+03:00)

Records

Results

References
 Weightlifting Database
 Results

Weightlifting at the 2006 Asian Games